Jaycee Park is a former spring training venue in Fort Pierce, Florida.

Jaycee Park or Jaycees Field may also refer to:

 Jaycee Park (Plainview, Texas)
 Jaycee Park (Hot Springs, Arkansas)
 Jaycees Field, Nacogdoches, Texas baseball venue